Union Cemetery located on East Howard Street in Bellefonte, Pennsylvania was established in 1795. Burials occurred as early as 1808, and the cemetery itself was chartered in 1856. It is the final resting place of Bellefonte's founding families, Pennsylvania Governors and their wives, U.S. Congressmen, war heroes and veterans, including black soldiers of the famous Union "Army of the James" in the American Civil War. Evan Pugh, the first President of the Pennsylvania State University is buried here.

Notable interments
Notable people buried at the Union Cemetery:

References

External links
  Union Cemetery, Bellefonte, PA: Search the Burial Records Database

Cemeteries in Pennsylvania
Tourist attractions in Centre County, Pennsylvania
Buildings and structures in Centre County, Pennsylvania